Dirty Dancing: Havana Nights (also known as Dirty Dancing 2 or Dirty Dancing 2: Havana Nights) is a 2004 American dance musical romance film directed by Guy Ferland and starring Diego Luna, Romola Garai, Sela Ward, John Slattery, Jonathan Jackson, January Jones, and Mika Boorem. The film is an unrelated prequel/"re-imagining" of the 1987 blockbuster Dirty Dancing, reusing the same basic plot, but transplanting it from upstate New York to Cuba on the cusp of the Cuban Revolution. Patrick Swayze, star of the original Dirty Dancing, appears as a dance instructor. It was mostly filmed in Old San Juan, Puerto Rico.

Plot
In 1958, Katey Miller (Romola Garai), her parents (Sela Ward and John Slattery), and her younger sister Susie (Mika Boorem) arrive in Cuba during the Cuban revolution. A self-described bookworm, Katey is not very happy about having to move to a different country during her senior year of high school, as she had been planning to attend Radcliffe College, although the rest of her family seem extremely pleased to be in Cuba.

Meeting several other rich American teenagers down by the pool - including James Phelps (Jonathan Jackson), the son of her father's boss - Katey becomes disgusted when one of the teenagers insults a local waiter when he drops their drinks because Katey accidentally bumped into him. Katey attempts to talk to the waiter—Javier (Diego Luna), who works at the hotel to support his family—because she feels awful about what had occurred, but he is not interested.

Katey watches a film of her mother and father dancing and wishes she could dance as well as they did. She and her father dance a bit. The next day in class, Katey is asked to read aloud from the Odyssey - a passage about love and passion. After class, James invites her to a party at the country club the next day and she accepts.

While walking home from school, she sees Javier dancing to street music, and he offers to walk her home. They stop to listen to a street band and police show up, stopping Javier while Katey runs away.

The next day, Katey tries some of the dance moves she saw. Javier sees her and asks her to come see the real dancers Saturday night, but she says she is already going to the country club. Javier gets upset and leaves. Katey wears one of her maid's dresses to the country club party and impresses James. Katey convinces him to take her to the Cuban nightclub La Rosa Negra (The Black Rose) where Javier is dancing with the ladies.

Javier dances with Katey while James sits at the bar. Soon he is accosted by Javier's brother, Carlos, who tells him that they will eventually kick the Americans out of Cuba. Javier comes over and argues with his brother. James takes Katey back to the car and assaults her after she refuses to kiss him. She slaps him and runs into the club, and Javier agrees to walk her home.

The next day, Katey walks by a dance class. The teacher (Patrick Swayze) asks if anyone wants to enter the big dance contest and then dances with Katey for a bit. She grabs a flyer for the competition.

While walking to the pool, James apologizes to Katey and then tells her that Susie saw Javier with her and got him fired. Katey argues with Susie and goes to find Javier. He is now working at a chop shop with Carlos. She asks him to enter the dance contest with her, but he refuses. Meanwhile, it is becoming apparent that Carlos is helping the revolutionaries.

The next day, Javier shows up at Katey's school and agrees to enter the dance contest with her. They start teaching each other dance moves and Javier convinces her to "feel the music." They practice all the time, and Katey dances some more with the dance teacher, until it is the night of the dance. Katey and Javier dance with the other couples on the floor and are chosen to go on to the next round.

Katey's parents disapprove of her relationship with Javier, but Katey reconciles with them. On the night of the contest's final round, while Katey and Javier are on the dance floor, Javier sees his brother and some revolutionaries disguised as waiters, and the police soon try to arrest them. The contest stops as everyone flees the club, and Javier has to save Carlos from the police. Javier and Carlos talk about how they miss their dad, then they hear that Batista has fled the country and join the celebration.

Later, Javier comes to the hotel and finds Katey. He takes her to the beach and they have sex. The next day, Katey's parents tell her they are leaving Cuba and she has one last night with Javier. They go to the Cuban club where they first danced, and the floor is theirs as they are dubbed King and Queen. Katey's family is there to see her, and Katey narrates that she doesn't know when she will see Javier again, but this will not be their last time to dance together.

Cast
 Romola Garai as Katey Miller
 Diego Luna as Javier Suarez
 Sela Ward as Jeannie Miller
 John Slattery as Bert Miller
 Mika Boorem as Susie Miller
 Jonathan Jackson as James Phelps
 Rene Lavan as Carlos Suarez
 Patrick Swayze as Dance Class Instructor
 January Jones as Eve
 Mýa Harrison as Lola Martinez
 Angélica Aragón as Mrs. Suarez

Production
Havana Nights is based on an original screenplay by playwright and NPR host Peter Sagal, based on the real life experience of producer JoAnn Jansen, who lived in Cuba as a 15-year-old in 1958–59. Sagal wrote the screenplay, which he titled Cuba Mine, about a young American woman who witnessed the Cuban revolution and had a romance with a young Cuban revolutionary. The screenplay was to be a serious political romance story, documenting, among other stories, how the Cuban revolution transformed from idealism to terror. It was commissioned in 1992 by Lawrence Bender, who was rising to fame with his production of Quentin Tarantino's Reservoir Dogs and Pulp Fiction. The screenplay was bought by a film studio, which requested several rewrites before deciding not to produce the film. A decade later, Bender decided to make a Dirty Dancing sequel, and the film was very loosely adapted from Sagal's script. Not a single line from Sagal's original screenplay appears in the final film and Sagal says that the only remnants of the political theme that existed in his script is a scene wherein some people are executed.

Natalie Portman was offered the role of Katey Miller but she turned it down. Ricky Martin was also considered for the role of Javier Suarez. The film was British actress Romola Garai's first Hollywood film and she repeatedly has cited the filming of the movie as being an extremely negative experience which caused her to re-evaluate working in Hollywood. In a 2004 interview with The Telegraph she explained that the filmmakers "were obsessed with having someone skinny. I just thought, why didn't they get someone like Kate Bosworth, if that's what they wanted?"

In October 2017, in the midst of producer Harvey Weinstein's sexual abuse allegations in Hollywood, Garai later revealed that Weinstein, whose company Miramax was co-producing the film, had required her to meet him alone in a hotel room while he was wearing only a bathrobe to obtain the part: "I had to go to his hotel room in the Savoy, and he answered the door in his bathrobe. I was only 18. I felt violated by it, it has stayed very clearly in my memory."

Reception
Review aggregator Rotten Tomatoes gives the film a 23% rating based on 108 reviews from critics, with an average rating of 4.2/10. The website provides a brief critical consensus: "Cheesy, unnecessary remake." On Metacritic, the film has a weighted average score of 39 out of 100, based on 32 critics, indicating "generally unfavorable reviews".

Robert Denerstein of the Rocky Mountain News gave it a D+, saying: "Tries to add Cuban flavor to a familiar plot but comes up with nothing more than a bubbling stew of cliches." Peter Howell of the Toronto Star thought it to be "Charmless, clumsy and culturally offensive all at the same time" and merited it 1 out of 5 stars. Wesley Morris of The Boston Globe awarded it 2 out of 4 stars, saying: "As you might expect, the movie is as square as a sock hop." Philip Martin of the Arkansas Democrat-Gazette, who rated it B−, because "aside from the triteness of the dialogue, the mathematical predictability of the script and the muddling of numbskulled politics, DD: HN is a fairly enjoyable experience." According to Louis Hobson of Jam! Magazine, who thought the movie was worth 3.5 out of 5 stars, the main redeeming factor was the choreography: "You may have problems with the obvious, clichéd story, but the dancing is incredible." Philip Wuntch of The Dallas Morning News gave the film a C, stating that "both the dance numbers and the personal drama are largely listless."

Soundtrack

 "Dance Like This" – Wyclef Jean featuring Claudette Ortiz	
 "Dirty Dancing" – The Black Eyed Peas
 "Guajira (I Love U 2 Much)" – Yerba Buena
 "Can I Walk By" – Phalon Alexander featuring Monica Arnold
 "Satellite (From "Havana Nights")" – Santana featuring Jorge Moreno
 "El Beso Del Final" – Christina Aguilera
 "Represent, Cuba" – Orishas featuring Heather Headley
 "Do You Only Wanna Dance" – Mýa Harrison
 "You Send Me" – Shawn Kane
 "El Estuche" – Aterciopelados
 "Do You Only Wanna Dance" – Julio Daivel Big Band (conducted by Cucco Peña)
 "Satellite (Spanish Version) Nave Espacial (From "Havana Nights")" – Santana featuring Jorge Moreno

References

External links
 
 
 
 

2004 films
2000s coming-of-age drama films
2000s dance films
2004 romantic drama films
2000s romantic musical films
2000s teen drama films
2000s teen romance films
A Band Apart films
American coming-of-age drama films
American dance films
American musical drama films
American romantic drama films
American romantic musical films
American teen drama films
American teen musical films
American teen romance films
Artisan Entertainment films
Coming-of-age romance films
Dirty Dancing films
Films about interracial romance
Films directed by Guy Ferland
Films produced by Lawrence Bender
Films scored by Heitor Pereira
Films set in 1958
Films set in Havana
Films shot in Puerto Rico
Films with screenplays by Boaz Yakin
Miramax films
2000s English-language films
2000s American films
American prequel films